Howard Scott (April 1, 1890 – January 1, 1970) was an American engineer and founder of the Technocracy movement. He formed the Technical Alliance and Technocracy Incorporated.

Early life
Little is known about Scott's background or his early life and he has been described as a "mysterious young man". He was born in Virginia in 1890 and was of Scottish-Irish descent. He claimed to have been educated in Europe, but his training did not include any formal higher education.

In 1918, shortly before the end of WWI, Scott appeared in New York City. Scott worked in various construction camps, where he picked up on-the-job engineering experience, and in 1918 was working in a cement pouring group at Muscle Shoals. Following this, Scott established himself in Greenwich Village as "a kind of Bohemian engineer". Scott also ran a small business called Duron Chemical Company which made paint and floor polish at Pompton Lakes, New Jersey. Scott's job was to deliver his goods and show his customers how to use the floor polishing material.

Technocracy
At the end of World War I, Howard Scott helped to form the Technical Alliance which explored economic and social trends in North America; the Technical Alliance disbanded in 1921. In 1920, the Industrial Workers of the World hired Scott as a research director.

Scott, together with Walter Rautenstrauch formed the Committee on Technocracy in 1932, which advocated a more rational and productive society headed by technical experts. The Committee disbanded in January 1933, after only a few months, largely because of different views held by Scott and Rautenstrauch as well as widespread criticism of Scott. Scott had "overstated his academic credentials", and he was discovered not to be a "distinguished engineer".

On January 13, 1933, Scott gave a speech about technocracy at New York's Hotel Pierre, before a live audience of 400, which was also broadcast on radio nationwide. Unfortunately for Scott however, the speech was subsequently called a "grave mistake", "disastrous", and "a complete failure",  as it was most likely that Scott had no experience or training as a public speaker.

Genesis of the technocratic movement
M. King Hubbert joined the staff of Columbia University in 1931 and met Howard Scott. Hubbert and Scott co-founded Technocracy Incorporated in 1933, with Scott as leader and Hubbert as secretary. Scott remained as the chief engineer of Technocracy Incorporated until his death in 1970. Scott "argued indefatigably that scientific analysis of industrial production would show the path to lasting efficiency and unprecedented abundance". Scott gained many supporters within the movement. M. King Hubbert, for example, considered Scott extremely knowledgeable in physics. There was some discontent with Scott's leadership during WWII and a number of technocrats broke away from Technocracy Inc. and established their own breakaway organisation which only lasted for about a year.

Radical reform
Technocracy Inc. formed in 1931 to promote the ideas of Howard Scott. Scott saw government and industry as wasteful and unfair and believed that an economy run by engineers would be efficient and equitable. He called for the "price system" and fiat currencies to be replaced with a system based on how much energy it takes to produce specific goods. Scott called for engineers to run a continental government, which he termed a technate, to "optimize the use of energy to assure abundance." Virtually unknown today, the organization boasted over half a million members in California alone at its peak in the 1930s and 1940s.

References

External links

 The Hotel Pierre Address
 A pamphlet of a given address by Howard Scott before the National Technological Congress and the Continental Convention on Technocracy at the Morris Hotel, Chicago, Ill. in June, 1933
 The Last Utopians 

1890 births
1970 deaths
Technocracy movement
20th-century American engineers
Industrial Workers of the World people
Engineers from Virginia